Amrabat is a surname. Notable people with the surname include:

Nordin Amrabat (born 1987), Moroccan footballer
Sofyan Amrabat (born 1996), Dutch-born Moroccan footballer